The 1910–11 Drexel Blue and Gold men's basketball team represented Drexel Institute of Art, Science and Industry during the 1910–11 men's basketball season. The Blue and Gold, led by 1st year head coach Frank Griffin, played their home games at Main Building.

Roster

Schedule

|-
!colspan=9 style="background:#F8B800; color:#002663;"| Regular season
|-

References

Drexel Dragons men's basketball seasons
Drexel
1910 in sports in Pennsylvania
1911 in sports in Pennsylvania